The 2008–09 OK Liga Femenina was the first edition of Spain's premier women's rink hockey championship. It was played without Catalan teams due to the high cost of the travels during the competition.

Biesca Gijón was the first champion of the new league.

League table

Copa de la Reina

The 2009 Copa de la Reina was the 4th edition of the Spanish women's roller hockey cup. It was played in Mieres.

Vilanova L'Ull Blau won its first cup ever by beating Alcorcón Cat's Best in the final by 10–1, the widest win ever in a final of this competition.

References

2008 in roller hockey
2009 in roller hockey
OK Liga Femenina seasons